The IMOCA 60 Class yacht Pindar (2) was designed by Juan Kouyoumdjian and launched in 2007 after being assembled by Cookson Boats based in New Zealand. Soon after launch the boat lost it mast during Cowes Week. The boat was conceived for a mixed of crewed racing and therefore was the most powerful IMOCA of it generation with a number of initiative features. The boat was extensively damaged in 2013–2014 and has not sailed since and has been written off by the insurance company.

Not to be confused with the IMOCA 50 and IMOCA 60 both previous named Pindar.

Racing results

References 

Individual sailing yachts
2000s sailing yachts
Sailboat type designs by Juan Kouyoumdjian
Vendée Globe boats
IMOCA 60